This is an incomplete list of Statutory Rules of Northern Ireland in 1984.

 Building Societies (Accounts and Annual Return) Regulations (Northern Ireland) 1984 S.R. 1984 No. 334

1984
Statutory rules
1984 in law
Northern Ireland Statutory Rules